Albert Drew (30 October 1906 – 20 February 1984) was an Australian cricketer. He played fourteen first-class matches for Western Australia between 1924/25 and 1932/33.

See also
 List of Western Australia first-class cricketers

References

External links
 

1906 births
1984 deaths
Australian cricketers
Western Australia cricketers